United Nations Security Council resolution 454, adopted on 2 November 1979, after hearing representations from the People's Republic of Angola, the Council recalled resolutions 387 (1976) and 447 (1979), noting its concern and condemned the continuing attacks on the country by South Africa through illegally-occupied South West Africa.

The Council demanded South Africa cease the attacks and respect Angola's sovereignty and territorial integrity. It also called upon South Africa to cease using the territory of South West Africa to launch attacks against Angola and other African states. The resolution requested that Member States offer immediate assistance to Angola in order to strengthen its defence capabilities.

The resolution was approved by 12 votes to none; France, the United Kingdom and United States abstained.

See also
 List of United Nations Security Council Resolutions 401 to 500 (1976–1982)
 Namibian War of Independence
 Apartheid

References
Text of the Resolution at undocs.org

External links
 

 0454
20th century in South Africa
1979 in Africa
 0454
Angola–South Africa relations
November 1979 events